Curtis Johnson may refer to:

Curt Johnson (soccer) (born 1968), soccer manager
Curt Johnson, the creator of the Microsoft Minesweeper computer game
Curtis Johnson (cornerback) (born 1948), former cornerback
Curtis Johnson (linebacker) (born 1985), American football player
Curtis Johnson (politician) (born 1952), American politician
Curtis Johnson (American football coach) (born 1961), football coach
Curtis Johnson (athlete) (born 1973), American athlete
S. Curtis Johnson, business magnate
Dan Curtis Johnson, programmer and comic book writer

See also
Samuel Curtis Johnson (disambiguation)
Kirk Johnson (born 1972), Canadian boxer